KWSB-FM is college radio station based at Western Colorado University in Gunnison. The station has been in continuous operation since January 1968 and recently celebrated its 40th anniversary with alumni and former staff. For a long period throughout the 1970s, it was the only station in the Gunnison area that played popular music, that is, played more than simply country music. This reputation for free and hip music gives it notoriety among students and locals. It has one of the largest vinyl collections in the state collegiate radio station system. Members have received multiple awards for excellent broadcasting from the Colorado Broadcasters Association over the years and is considered a major asset to the university. The station provides non-commercial service to Gunnison and relies on the communications budget and local underwriting to stay afloat. The staff is made up entirely of students and is advised by a professor in the communications department. The station is also known as "The Penguin" and phonetic "Quizbee" by students and staff . The station provides live DJing experience to any students that take the Communication and Theatre 261 course, and provides news to the community.

History
On January 26, 1968 KWSB was born. It was created to fulfill the need for sports broadcasting, as well as provide listeners with folk, jazz, easy listening, and rock and roll. KWSB offered news and weather from the UPI Teletype service and Educational programming from the Intercollegiate Broadcasting System. Special Feature shows consisted of classical, music, dramatic and literary productions, as well as local talent, editorials, debates, lectures, panel discussions, and call-in shows. The staff was 11 strong including the first station manager, Jack Rickards. KWSB's signal was originally 10 watts from the basement of the old College Union on the frequency 91.9, with an antenna on the roof of Taylor Hall. In the beginning, DJs were on the air from 4pm until midnight, seven days a week.

'10 to '11 Shows
Shakespeare in the Alley (Dr. Bill King)
Skinny Dipping In A Sea of Lee (Lee Strickland)
Castaways and Cutouts (Sydney Toliver)
Epic Perspective (Trevor Mark)
This Week In Grateful Dead History (Max Pizey)
Dylans in the Attic (Lee Strickland)

2010-2011 Staff
Terry Schleisman- General Manager
Trevor Mark- Station Manager
Lee Strickland- Sports Director
Laura Anderson- Programming Director
Sydney Toliver- Music Director
Rusty Spydell- Production Director
Max Pizey- Promotions Director
Brad Mair- Station Trainer
Kate Edwards- News Director

2000-2001 Staff
Terry Schleisman- General Manager 
Anthony Pergola- Business Director 
Zachary Foubert- Sports Director

Recent Colorado Broadcasters Association awards

2005 (small market)
Best Midday Show, "Walter Lovett With The Demon Hunter Interview" (certificate)

2006 (small market)
Best Public Service Announcement, "Save Safe Ride" (certificate)
Best On-Air Promotional Campaign, "Wake Up Stinger" (certificate)
Best Midday Show, "The Vagarant Power Hour" (certificate)
Best Evening Show, "The Chiodos Phoner" (certificate)

2008 (small market)
Best News Feature Report or Series, "Steven Shepler and Trevor Mark- Katabasis Destiny Interview" (certificate)

2009 (small market)
Best Public Service Announcement "Student Film Night" by Sydney Toliver and Josh Billings (certificate)
Best News Feature Report or Series "I Love You, You're Perfect, Now Change" by Glenn DiNicola (certificate)
Best Single Event News Coverage "Ashley Stephens Story by Terry Schliesman" (first place) and "The Goat Story by Terry Schliesman" (certificate)

References

External links

WSB-FM
WSB-FM
Radio stations established in 1968